Hesham Mohamed Hussien Mohamed Hassan (born 3 January 1990) is an Egyptian professional footballer. He plays as a midfielder for Egyptian Premier League club Pyramids, as well as the Egypt U20 and U23 national team.

Hesham Mohamed He is the brother of the player Hosam Mohamed.

International career

International goals
Scores and results list Egypt's goal tally first.

References

1990 births
Living people
Egyptian footballers
Egypt international footballers
Association football midfielders
Al Ahly SC players
Ittihad El Shorta SC players
Egyptian Premier League players